Dizi may refer to:

Dizi (instrument), a Chinese transverse flute
Dizi (woreda), a district of Ethiopia
Dizi people, an ethnic group in southern Ethiopia
Dizi language
Dizi, Iran
Abgoosht, a Persian dish
Turkish television drama series (dizi meaning 'series' in Turkish)

See also
 Dizhi (disambiguation)
 Dizy (disambiguation)
 Dizzy (disambiguation)

Language and nationality disambiguation pages